$980 million (2019)
| net_income    = {{}} $357 million (2019)
| assets        = {{}} $5.83 billion (2019)
| equity        = {{}} $3.23 billion (2019)
| num_employees = 2,500 (2019)
| website       = 
| footnotes     = 
}}
Diamond Offshore Drilling, Inc. is an offshore drilling contractor. The company is headquartered in Katy, Texas, United States, and has major offices in Australia, Brazil, Mexico, Scotland, Singapore, and Norway.

The company operates 15 drilling rigs including 11 semi-submersible platforms and 4 drillships.

In 2019, the company's revenues were primarily from Hess Corporation (28.9%), Occidental Petroleum (20.6%), Petrobras (19.5%), and BP (3.1%). Operations in the United States accounted for 52.5% of the company's revenues in 2019.

History
In the early 1960s, Brewster-Bartle, an onshore drilling company, filed bankruptcy. In 1964, Don McMahon acquired Brewster-Bartle from its bank creditors and formed Diamond M Drilling Company, named after Diamond M Acres, his ranch near Simonton, Texas, which then expanded into offshore drilling.

In 1970, Diamond M became a public company via an initial public offering.

In 1977, Kaneb Services acquired the company for $102 million.

In 1989, Loews Corporation acquired the company for $48.5 million.

In 1992, Diamond M Corporation acquired ODECO from Murphy Oil for $358 million. Shortly thereafter, Diamond M Corp. briefly changed its name to Diamond M-ODECO Drilling Inc. before becoming Diamond Offshore Drilling, Inc. in 1993.

In October 1995, the company once again became a public company via an initial public offering, listing on the New York Stock Exchange.

In April 1996, the company acquired Arethusa for $516 million in stock. Arethusa had previously acquired Zapata Corporation (now HRG Group).

In May 2012, the company ordered a $655 million drillship from Hyundai Heavy Industries.

On February 8, 2016, the company discontinued payment of a quarterly cash dividend. In September 2016, the company was removed from the S&P 500 Index.

In April 2020, the company filed for bankruptcy in part due to the oil price collapse following the reduction in oil demand during the COVID-19 pandemic. The company was criticized for taking CARES Act bailout money - intended for small businesses - and, in bankruptcy court, turning it into executive bonuses.

Controversies

Worker asbestos exposure
In 1989, Diamond's predecessor bought 6 drilling rigs from the predecessor of Kaneb Management. Some of Kaneb's employees continued to work for Diamond after the transaction and then sued Diamond for personal injuries they allegedly suffered from asbestos exposure while they worked for Kaneb. In a 2013 filing with the SEC, Diamond acknowledged that its equipment had been used for the "manufacture and use of asbestos-containing drilling mud" but sought to be indemnified from liability.

Diamond Offshore was dubbed as a member of the Misogynist 7 by the Street because the company includes no female on the board of directors.

References

External links

1970s initial public offerings
Companies formerly listed on the New York Stock Exchange
Companies traded over-the-counter in the United States
Companies based in Houston
Drilling rig operators
Service companies of the United States
Petroleum industry in the United States
Companies that filed for Chapter 11 bankruptcy in 2020